Nicolae Feodosei (born 6 December 1962) is a Romanian sprint canoer who competed in the mid-1980s. He won two medals at the ICF Canoe Sprint World Championships with a gold (K-4 1000 m: 1983) and a silver (K-4 10000 m: 1986).

Feodosei also competed at the 1984 Summer Olympics in Los Angeles, finishing fourth in the K-4 1000 m and fifth in the K-2 500 m events.

References
  "FEODOSEI Nicolae"

External links
 
 

1962 births
Canoeists at the 1984 Summer Olympics
Living people
Olympic canoeists of Romania
Romanian male canoeists
ICF Canoe Sprint World Championships medalists in kayak